The 2017 IQA European Games were the second European championship for the sport of quidditch. The tournament was held on 7–9 July 2017 in Oslo, Norway and was hosted by the Norges Rumpeldunkforbund and local club OSI Vikings. All European IQA member nations in good standing were allowed to compete. The winners of the tournament were the United Kingdom, who defeated the defending champions France 90*-70 in the final. France subsequently took the silver medal and Norway won the bronze, after defeating Belgium 140*-80. This tournament marked the United Kingdom's first international gold medal at quidditch.

Competing teams
The following 15 teams have registered to compete:

Structure
The tournament followed the usual two stage format with a group stage on Day One and a bracket on Day Two. The 15 participating teams were divided into three five-member stacked groups according to their previous World Cup standing, with Group A comprising the five highest-ranked teams and Group C the five lowest-ranked teams. Following the group stage, all teams within each group were seeded according to their performance and moved on to the bracket.

Results

Group stage

Group A

Group B

Group C

Bracket

Quarter-final consolation

Round of 16 consolation

Notes

References

External links
IQA website

Quidditch competitions
2017 in Norwegian sport
International sports competitions in Oslo
July 2017 sports events in Europe
2010s in Oslo